The Bavarian State Collection of Zoology or ZSM is a major German research institution for zoological systematics in Munich. It has over 20 million zoological specimens. It is one of the largest natural history collections in the world. The sections are Entomology, Invertebrates and Vertebrates. The history of the museum is outlined on the museum's home page together with a biography of Johann Baptist von Spix the first curator of zoology.

See also
Museum Witt Museum Witt Munich (MWM) is a department of the Bavarian State Collection of Zoology (Zoologische Staatssammlung München).
List of museums in Germany
List of natural history museums

References

External links
 ZSM Homepage
 ZSM Homepage

Museums in Munich
Natural history museums in Germany
Research institutes in Munich